The Saint Roch Parish Church, is a Roman Catholic Church in the municipality of Lemery, Batangas in the Philippines. Dedicated to St. Roch and to the Our Lady of Divine Grace as its secondary patron, the fiesta is celebrated every August 16 in honor of St Roch. The feast of the Our Lady of Divine Grace is celebrated every August 15, with the traditional "Pagsundo sa Birhen" held every year in Barangay Wawa. The parish became independent from Taal by the order of Manila's Archbishop on May 12, 1868. The parish had recently celebrated its 150th anniversary last 2018
.

History
Originally a barrio of Taal under the name of San Genaro. It was separated from Taal in 1862, under the new name of "Lemery", and was accepted by the Augustinian Chapter in 1866. In 1867, Fr. Jose Martin started the construction of a church made of hew stone. Fr. Raymundo Cortazar finished the church in 1880 and the cemetery in 1887. The church features a baroque facade flanked by twin towers. Unfortunately, the facade of the church was damaged in the Liberation of 1945. The facade was demolished in 1968 to pave the way for new one both facade and twin towers were pulled down to give may to modern cement structure. It is said that the facade was sinking due to its weight.

The church underwent renovations in 2013, remodeling the post war facade. The renovation included a new Altar Mayor, new side altars and the addition of new paintings to enhance the church's interior

References

External links

Roman Catholic churches in Batangas
Churches in the Roman Catholic Archdiocese of Lipa